Amr Sobhy is an Egyptian information activist, social and tech entrepreneur, published author and poet. He is best known as co-creator of MorsiMeter; a digital initiative and online platform to document and monitor the performance of Egyptian President, Mohamed Morsi, which has attracted a wide global attention. The initiative modeled after Obameter is considered to be the first in Egypt and the Middle East to hold a president accountable for his promises. His work gave rise to other political promise trackers including Iran's Rouhani Meter and Canada's TrudeauMeter.

Awards
 100 Most Influential Young Africans 2017.   
 Forbes 30 Most Promising Young Entrepreneurs In Africa 2017
 Nominated for Data Journalism Award 2016 by Global Editors Network for Open Data category.  
World Summit Awards 2012
Mastercard Foundation Anzisha Fellowship 2011
World Summit Awards 2011
Egypt's Award for Child Literature (Internet Applications, 2004)

Literary works
 Zatul Redaa' al-Kormozeyy  (The Lady in Scarlet - ذات الرداء القرمزي, 2012, Poetry)
  Yawmyat Kahl Sagheer al-Sen  (Diary of a Timeworn Lad - يوميات كهل صغير السن, 2011, Prose) 
  Addahshatul Ola  (The First Marvel - الدهشة الأولى, 2008, Poetry)

References

External links
 Amr Sobhy Instagram

1988 births
Living people
Egyptian activists
21st-century Egyptian poets
Egyptian male poets
21st-century male writers